Habib Metropolitan Bank, commonly known as HABIBMETRO, is a Pakistani subsidiary of Swiss bank Habib Bank AG Zurich. It is based in Karachi, Pakistan. It has a branch network of 490+.

History
The bank was founded in October 1992 as Metropolitan Bank and subsequently started its operations.

Habib Bank AG Zurich was founded by Mohammed Ali Habib of the House of Habib as the government started privatization of the banking sector in Pakistan.

In 2006, Habib Bank AG Zurich's Pakistan operations were merged into Metropolitan Bank Limited and subsequently renamed Habib Metropolitan Bank Limited.

In 2015, HABIBMETRO won Asian Development Bank (ADB) award.

The parent bank, Habib Bank AG Zurich has operations in Hong Kong, Singapore, United Arab Emirates, Kenya, South Africa, United Kingdom and Canada.

FinCEN 
HABIBMETRO was named in FinCEN leak, published by Buzzfeed News and the International Consortium of Investigative Journalists (ICIJ). It had two suspicious transactions flagged.

Awards 
HABIBMETRO was awarded Best Islamic Banking Brand at the GIFA in 2020.

References

External links
 Official Website

Pakistani subsidiaries of foreign companies
Companies listed on the Pakistan Stock Exchange
Pakistani companies established in 1992
Banks established in 1992
Banks of Pakistan
Companies based in Karachi
2006 mergers and acquisitions
Mergers and acquisitions of Pakistani companies